Nephthyigorgia is a genus of soft corals of the family Nidaliidae .

Species
The World Register of Marine Species lists the following species as accepted.

 Nephthyigorgia annectans. (Thomson & Simpson, 1909) 
 Nephthyigorgia aurantiaca. Kükenthal, 1910 
 Nephthyigorgia crassa. Kükenthal, 1910 
 Nephthyigorgia kükenthali. Broch, 1916 
 Nephthyigorgia pinnata. Kükenthal, 1910

References

Nidaliidae